Bessy is a commune in the Aube department in north-central France that lies 43 km east of Nogent-sur-Seine.

Population

See also
Communes of the Aube department

References

Communes of Aube